The Last Time or Last Time may refer to:

Film 
 The Last Time (film), a 2006 film starring Michael Keaton and Brendan Fraser
 The Last Time, a 2002 short film featuring Linda Bassett

Music

Albums
 Last Time (album), by Typecast, 2002
 The Last Time (album), by John Farnham, 2002

Songs
 "Last Time" (Fuel song), 2001
 "Last Time" (Labrinth song), 2012
 "Last Time" (Trey Songz song), 2008
 "The Last Time" (Agnetha Fältskog song), 1987
 "The Last Time" (All That Remains song), 2011
 "The Last Time" (Johnny Cash song), 1980
 "The Last Time" (Rolling Stones song), 1965
 "The Last Time" (The Script song), 2019
 "The Last Time" (Taylor Swift song), 2013
 "The Last Time" (Tenille Townes song), 2022
 "Last Time", by Gucci Mane from The Return of East Atlanta Santa, 2016
 "Last Time", by Idina Menzel from Idina, 2016
 "Last Time", by Rudimental from Toast to Our Differences, 2019
 "Last Time", by Shea Seger from The May Street Project, 2000
 "The Last Time", by Big Brother & the Holding Company from Big Brother & the Holding Company, 1967
 "The Last Time", by Bread from Bread, 1969
 "The Last Time", by Carina Round, 2011
 "The Last Time", by Eric Benét from Hurricane, 2005
 "The Last Time", by Eurythmics from Revenge, 1986
 "The Last Time", by Forever Changed from The Need to Feel Alive, 2005
 "The Last Time", by Gnarls Barkley from St. Elsewhere, 2006
 "The Last Time", by John Hiatt from Beneath This Gruff Exterior, 2003
 "The Last Time", by One Ok Rock from Eye of the Storm, 2019
 "The Last Time", by Paradise Lost from Draconian Times, 1995
 "The Last Time", by Rihanna from Music of the Sun, 2005
 "The Last Time", by Robyn from Robyn Is Here, 1995
 "The Last Time", by Soulsavers from Angels & Ghosts, 2015
 "The Last Time", by Talk Talk from It's My Life, 1984
 "The Last Time", by Within Temptation, a B-side of the single "All I Need", 2007

See also